Ishak Saporta (born 12 April 1957) is a professor of business ethics at Tel Aviv University.

Biography
Ishak Saporta was born to parents who immigrated to Israel from Turkey. He has degrees in psychology, philosophy and labor studies. In 1995, he earned a PhD from the University of California, Berkeley in labor relations and organizational behavior. Saporta is a senior lecturer in the management faculty of Tel Aviv University. 
Saporta is a social activist and a board member of Adva Center for equality research in Israel. He has been a member of Hakeshet Hademokratit Hamizrahit since its foundation in 1996.

In 2003, Saporta and Yossi Dahan Haokets(Hebrew for "sting") which surveys social and economic trends in Israel from a social-democrat point of view.

References

External links
 Haokets site in hebrew

Israeli sociologists
Academic staff of Tel Aviv University
Living people
Year of birth missing (living people)
Israeli people of Turkish-Jewish descent